The 2021 Challenger de Santiago III was a professional tennis tournament played on clay courts. It was the 15th edition of the tournament which was part of the 2021 ATP Challenger Tour. It took place in Santiago, Chile between 11 and 17 October 2021.

Singles main-draw entrants

Seeds

 1 Rankings are as of 4 October 2021.

Other entrants
The following players received wildcards into the singles main draw:
  Diego Fernández Flores
  Matías Soto
  Benjamín Torres

The following player received entry into the singles main draw using a protected ranking:
  Gerald Melzer

The following players received entry into the singles main draw as alternates:
  Hernán Casanova
  Nick Chappell
  Facundo Díaz Acosta
  Gonzalo Lama

The following players received entry from the qualifying draw:
  Nicolás Álvarez
  Oliver Crawford
  Diego Hidalgo
  Rafael Matos

The following player received entry as a lucky loser:
  Lucas Catarina

Champions

Singles

  Sebastián Báez def.  Felipe Meligeni Alves 3–6, 7–6(8–6), 6–1.

Doubles

  Evan King /  Max Schnur def.  Hans Hach Verdugo /  Miguel Ángel Reyes-Varela 3–6, 7–6(7–3), [16–14].

References

2021 ATP Challenger Tour
2021
2021 in Chilean tennis
October 2021 sports events in Chile